HMS Carlisle was a 60-gun fourth rate ship of the line of the English Royal Navy, launched at Deptford on 11 February 1693.

Carlisle was wrecked in 1696.

Notes

References

Lavery, Brian (2003) The Ship of the Line - Volume 1: The development of the battlefleet 1650-1850. Conway Maritime Press. .

Ships of the line of the Royal Navy
1690s ships